Gujrani is a village in the Bhiwani district of the Indian state of Haryana. , the village had 948 households with a total population of 4,883 of which 2,640 were male and 2,243 female. The village is located next to Bhiwani Airport.

References

Villages in Bhiwani district